Lego DC Comics Super Heroes: Aquaman – Rage of Atlantis is a 2018 American computer-animated superhero comedy film. It is based on the DC Comics and Lego brands. Produced by DC Entertainment, The Lego Group and Warner Bros. Animation and distributed by Warner Bros. Home Entertainment. It premiered at the San Diego Comic-Con International on July 22, 2018 and was released digitally, DVD and Blu-ray on July 31, 2018. It is the eighth Lego DC Comics film. The film received mixed reviews, with praise for the animation but criticism for the consumerism.

Plot

At the Hall of Justice, Justice League newcomer Jessica Cruz is busy examining for suspicious activity when the Trouble Alert goes off, alerting Batman, Superman, Wonder Woman and Cyborg about Lobo's attack on a warehouse at Dread Lake storing alien technology. When Aquaman receives word of this, he attempts to join in. He soon realizes that Dread Lake is in fact a dry lake bed, leaving Aquaman's abilities futile as he is repeatedly beaten by Lobo until the Justice League arrive. Although Lobo manages to escape with a glowing blue orb despite their efforts.

Wanting to lighten the mood, Aquaman invites the Justice League to a feast that Atlantis is hosting in honor of his anniversary as king. While attending the feast (using a spray Batman designed to help them breathe underwater), Aquaman's brother Ocean Master soon gathers the inhabitants of Atlantis where the entire city is engulfed in a bizarre red light which begins to corrupt and enrage them (a force field created by Cruz prevents the Justice League from its effects). With Atlantis under his influence, Ocean Master reveals an Atlantean scroll which reveals a law that only a pure-blood Atlantean can be king. Since Aquaman is half-human, he reluctantly gives up the crown to Ocean Master.

Now in control, Ocean Master introduces his corrupted subjects to his new adviser Atrocitus, leader of the Red Lantern Corps (who was responsible for corrupting the Atlanteans) and demands the destruction of the Justice League. Attempting to escape the corrupted Atlanteans, Aquaman and the Justice League use a device known as the Atlantean Gateway (which can open portals to other water-based worlds) to escape. However, Cruz fails to enter the portal before it closes.

The Justice League end up arriving on a desert world with a red sun (rendering Superman powerless) and find themselves in a factory of Red Lantern vehicles and robots. Noticing that this planet's end of the gateway is being powered by the orb Lobo stole, the Justice League realize that Atrocitus plans to send his forces to Earth and have the Atlanteans invade the surface world. After escaping the factory, the Justice League have Aquaman (who is naturally drawn to water due to his Atlantean physiology) lead them to water where they find it in a bar known as the Watering Hole and learn that water on this planet has become scarce and expensive on this planet ever since Atrocitus drained it dry. Fearing that Earth will suffer a similar fate, the Justice League become determined to return home. Encountering Lobo, they learn that he was hired to steal the orb by Ocean Master and request his assistance in exchange for returning his beloved dolphin Fishy (who was also corrupted by the Red Lanterns) to him....an offer Lobo reluctantly accepts.

Back on Earth, Cruz is rescued by Mera who initially attempts to aid against the corrupted Atlanteans only to be corrupted herself. Escaping on a Red Lantern vehicle, Cruz makes it to a seaside fair where the Atlantean invasion begins. Cruz, Robin and Batgirl do their best to fend off the invading Atlanteans led by an enraged Mera. Upon realizing that the entire world is watching her on the news, Cruz flees from the battle, but works up the courage to return and fight back when she sees Mera attempting to corrupt Batgirl and Robin. Using her power ring, Cruz is able to defeat Mera and negate the effects of the Red Lantern light, returning Mera to her benevolent self.

Elsewhere, the Justice League attempt to return to Earth. They succeed in shutting down the Red Lantern's factory and the Gateway, but not before Fishy, Red Lantern Corps member Dex-Starr and a handful of Red Lantern drones make their way through it. Upset for their failure, Lobo storms off. The Justice League manage to use some reserve power and new vehicles to temporarily re-open the Gateway and return to Earth, but are defeated by Ocean Master and Atrocitus and locked in a gold cage.

At this moment, Atrocitus betrays Ocean Master and reveals his true intentions. Using a weapon known as the Submerged Limitless Underwater Rapid Pump (S.L.U.R.P.), Atrocitus plans to drain Earth's water supply and spray it into space until Earth is as dry as a desert. Seeing the error of his ways, Ocean Master helps the Justice League escape and uses his magic to protect them from the Red Lantern's light. Using the Trident of Poseidon (which can only be wielded by the rightful king of Atlantis), Aquaman is able to defeat Atrocitus and destroy the Red Lantern power battery (the source of his power), undoing the effects of its light. Surfacing, the Justice League, Batgirl, Robin and Mera attempt to destroy the S.L.U.R.P. but their efforts prove futile. Lobo (who has been reunited with Fishy) arrives to aid the Justice League. With Aquaman's advice to work together, the combined efforts of the Justice League and Lobo destroy the S.L.U.R.P. while Superman pushes the water that was already drained (which had frozen into a brick of ice) back into Earth's atmosphere where it melts into rain and is restored to Earth's oceans.

With Atlantis the peaceful and happy kingdom it once was once more, Ocean Master apologizes for his actions and even admits to falsifying the law which dethroned Aquaman in the first place. This, coupled with the fact that Aquaman was able to wield the Trident of Poseidon allow Aquaman to be rethroned as King of Atlantis. Atrocitus and Dex-Starr are handcuffed and acquired by Lobo who plans to head to Oa to collect the bounty placed on them. As he leaves with Fishy, Lobo states that when he returns he "might not be on his best behavior".

As the Justice League celebrate their victory, Cyborg receives word that Gorilla Grodd and his forces are attacking Kathmandu, forcing the Justice League into action.

Cast
 Dee Bradley Baker as Aquaman / Dex-Starr
 Troy Baker as Batman
 Eric Bauza as Jimmy Olsen
 Trevor Devall as Ocean Master
 Susan Eisenberg as Mera
 Jonathan Adams as Atrocitus
 Grey Griffin as Wonder Woman / Lois Lane / Ring
 Scott Menville as Robin / Damian Wayne
 Cristina Milizia as Green Lantern / Jessica Cruz
 Nolan North as Superman
 Khary Payton as Cyborg
 Alyson Stoner as Batgirl / Barbara Gordon
 Fred Tatasciore as Lobo

References

External links

2018 direct-to-video films
2018 computer-animated films
Animated films based on DC Comics
Aquaman films
Films about sentient toys
Films set in Atlantis
2010s superhero comedy films
Animated films based on video games
2010s American animated films
2010s direct-to-video animated superhero films
Lego DC Comics Super Heroes films
Films directed by Matt Peters
2010s English-language films